Landon Addison Thomas (October 31, 1799 – October 2, 1889) was an American politician.

Thomas was born in Frankfort, Kentucky, October 31, 1799, the son of Edmund and Ann (Chiles) Thomas, who removed from Virginia to Kentucky in 1796.  After graduation from Yale College in 1822, he returned to Frankfort and studied law in the office of the Hon. Solomon P. Sharp.  He was admitted to the bar, but never engaged in practice. Soon after completing his law studies he made an extended European tour.  Subsequently, he was for several years engaged in the dry-goods business in Frankfort in partnership with his uncle, and he continued to be identified until his death with the business interests of the city.  He accumulated a very large fortune and around 1840 built a large Federal style home at 312 Washington Street that exists today as a funeral home.  He had no taste for political life, but was induced on one occasion, 1847, to serve as representative for his county in the Kentucky Legislature. He was married, May 26, 1858, to Ellen M. Polk, of Shelby County, Ky., who survived him with two sons and two daughters,—another son having died in infancy.  He died at his home in Frankfort, on October 2, 1889, after six weeks' illness, having nearly completed his 90th year. His mind was clear to the last.

References

External links
 

1799 births
1889 deaths
People from Frankfort, Kentucky
Burials at Frankfort Cemetery
Members of the Kentucky House of Representatives
19th-century American politicians
Yale College alumni